Carlo Reguzzoni (18 January 1908 – 16 December 1996) was an Italian footballer who played as a winger.

Club career
Reguzzoni was born in Busto Arsizio, in the province of Varese, Lombardy. He made his Serie A debut with Pro Patria on 6 October 1929, in a 4–2 home win over Cremonese. He also played with Bologna in the 1930s and 1940s, where he spent most of his career, scoring 143 goals in 377 games for the club, making him Bologna's second highest goalscorer of all-time, behind only Angelo Schiavio. In total, he scored 155 goals in 401 appearances in Serie A.

International career
Reguzzoni made his only appearance for the Italy national football team on 14 April, 1940, in a 2–1 home win over Romania.

Honours

Club
Bologna
Serie A: 1935–36, 1936–37, 1938–39, 1940–41

References

1908 births
1996 deaths
People from Busto Arsizio
Italian footballers
Italy international footballers
Bologna F.C. 1909 players
Serie A players
Serie B players
Association football forwards
Footballers from Lombardy
Sportspeople from the Province of Varese